Anastase is a Basque feminine given name derived from the Ancient Greek name Anastasíā. It may refer to:

Given  names
Anastase Alfieri (1892 – 1971), Italian entomologist
Anastase Dragomir (1896–1966), Romanian inventor
Anastase Gasana (born 1950), Rwandan diplomat
Anastase Murekezi (born 1952), Rwandan politician
Anastase Shyaka, Rwandan academic and politician 
Anastase Simu (1854-1935), Romanian art collector 
Anastase Stolojan (1836– 1901), Romanian politician

Middle names
Henri Joseph Anastase Perrotin (1845 – 1904), French astronomer

Surnames
Roberta Anastase (born 1976), Romanian politician

See also

Anastasie

Notes

Basque feminine given names
Romanian masculine given names
Romanian-language surnames